Sarp is a commune in the Hautes-Pyrénées department in south-western France.

See also
Communes of the Hautes-Pyrénées department
 Barousse valley

References

Communes of Hautes-Pyrénées